Closter is an unincorporated community in Boone County, Nebraska, United States.

History
A post office was established at Closter in 1880, and remained in operation until it was discontinued in 1917. The community was named after Henry Closter, a pioneer settler.

References

Unincorporated communities in Boone County, Nebraska
Unincorporated communities in Nebraska